John Francis Moore (March 23, 1902 – April 4, 1991) was an outfielder in Major League Baseball. He hit better than .300 five times with the Cubs and Phillies with a high of .330 in 1934. He drove in 90 or more runs in a season two times with 98 RBI in 1934 and 93 RBI in 1935. He finished his 
10-year career with a .307 batting average (926-3013) with 73 home runs, 452 RBI, and 439 runs scored.

He was on the 1932 Chicago Cubs pennant-winning team, but went 0-7 with a run scored in 2 games in the World Series against the Yankees who swept the Cubs.

In 1945, Moore was called back to the majors by the Cubs after an 8-year stint in the minors in early September, and went 1-6 with 2 RBI down the stretch. He missed being eligible for the World Series roster by only one day.

In 1934, Moore enjoyed a 23-game hitting streak, the longest of his career, going 37-96 (.385) with 4 home runs and 22 RBI as a member of the Phillies.

His finest day in the majors came on July 22, 1936, at the Baker Bowl. Moore connected for 3 home runs, had 6 RBI, scored 4 runs and went 4-5 in a 16-4 rout of the Pirates.

Moore died April 4, 1991 at the age of 89 in Bradenton, Florida.

References

Sources

1902 births
1991 deaths
Atlanta Braves scouts
Baseball players from Connecticut
Boston Braves scouts
Chicago Cubs players
Cincinnati Reds players
Los Angeles Angels (minor league) players
Major League Baseball right fielders
Milwaukee Braves scouts
New Haven Profs players
Sportspeople from Waterbury, Connecticut
Philadelphia Phillies players
Reading Keystones players
Sportspeople from Bradenton, Florida
Waterbury Brasscos players